The 2001 British National Track Championships were a series of track cycling competitions held from 5–11 August 2001 at the Manchester Velodrome. The Championships were organised by the British Cycling Federation.

Medal summary

Men's Events

Women's Events

References

National Track Championships